Klaus Mølmer is a Danish physicist who is currently a professor at the Niels Bohr Institute of the University of Copenhagen. From 2000 to 2022, he was a professor of physics at the University of Aarhus.

In 1999, Mølmer and Anders Sørensen proposed the Mølmer–Sørensen gate for trapped ion quantum computing, which was one of the first proposals for the implementation of a multi-qubit gate on a physical system.

Mølmer was awarded the status of Fellow in the American Physical Society, after he was nominated by their Division of Atomic, Molecular & Optical Physics in 2008, for his outstanding and insightful contributions to theoretical quantum optics, quantum information science and quantum atom optics, including the development of novel computational methods to treat open systems in quantum mechanics and theoretical proposals for the quantum logic gates with trapped ions.

See also
Entanglement depth
Quantum jump method
Mølmer–Sørensen gate

References 

Fellows of the American Physical Society
American Physical Society
Danish physicists
Living people
Year of birth missing (living people)